Namiki Kawahara  (born 17 July 1989) is a Japanese mixed martial artist competing in the Strawweight division of ONE Championship. He is the current DEEP Strawweight champion.

Mixed martial arts career

Early career
Kawahara made his professional debut at Pancrase Osaka on July 26, 2015, against Tsukasa Zenji. The fight ended in a draw, as neither fighter achieved a stoppage inside the time limit. He won his next fight against Tatsuki Ozaki, which was likewise contested under the Pancrase banner, by unanimous decision.

He moved briefly to DEEP, where he made his promotional debut against Icho Tomonaga at DEEP Osaka Impact 2016. He won the fight by TKO, after just 16 seconds. He next fought Magisa at DEEP Cage Impact 2016 in Osaka, and won the fight by an armbar in the second round.

Returning to Pancrase, Kawahara suffered his first professional loss to Takuya Goto, by split decision.

He rebounded from this loss with a first-round TKO of Noriyuki Takei at DEEP Osaka Impact. He was then scheduled to fight Yutaro Muramoto at DEEP Cage Impact 2017, whom he beat by a second-round TKO.

His next fight was against Yuya Kodama at DEEP 80. The fight ended in a no-contest, as Kawahara landed an accidental low blow which rendered Kodama unable to continue. His next fight against Yutaro Muramoto, at DEEP 85, ended in a majority draw.

Following this four-fight unbeaten streak, Kawahara was scheduled to fight Haruo Ochi at DEEP 88 for the DEEP Strawweight title. Ochi won the fight by unanimous decision.

After his failed title bid, Kawahara was scheduled to make his RIZIN debut at Rizin 16 - Kobe, when he was scheduled to fight Takaki Soya. Soya won the fight by a first-round TKO.

DEEP title reign
Kawahara was scheduled to fight Jun Nakamura in a Pancrase and DEEP cross-promotional event, in a DEEP Strawweight title eliminator. Kawahara won the fight by a first-round TKO. After beating Nakamura, Kawahara was scheduled to once again challenge for the DEEP Strawweight title, in a rematch with Haruo Ochi. He beat Ochi by a second-round submission, locking in a rear-naked choke in the dying seconds of the second round. It was the highest profile victory of Kawahara's career up to that point.

Following his win against Haruo Ochi, and prior to signing with ONE Championship, Fight Matrix ranked him as the second best strawweight in the world.

ONE Championship
Kawahara then made his ONE Championship debut at ONE Championship: Unbreakable, being scheduled to fight Lito Adiwang as a late notice replacement for Hexigetu. Adiwang won the fight by a second-round TKO.

Kawahara was booked to face Danial Williams at ONE 156 on April 22, 2022. He lost the fight by unanimous decision.

Championships and accomplishments
 DEEP
DEEP Strawweight championship (One time, current)

eFight.jp
August 2020 Fighter of the Month

Mixed martial arts record
 

|-
|Loss
|align=center|7–5–1 (1)
|Danial Williams
|Decision (unanimous)
|ONE 156
|
|align=center|3
|align=center|5:00
|Kallang, Singapore
|
|-
|Loss
|align=center|7–4–1 (1)
|Lito Adiwang
|KO (punch)
|ONE Championship: Unbreakable
|
|align=center|2
|align=center|2:02
|Kallang, Singapore
|
|-
|Win
|align=center|7–3–1 (1)
|Haruo Ochi
|Submission (rear-naked choke)
|Deep - 96 Impact
|
|align=center|2
|align=center|4:43
|Tokyo, Japan
|
|-
|Win
|align=center|6–3–1 (1)
|Jun Nakamura
|KO (punch)
|Deep & Pancrase - Osaka Tournament
|
|align=center|1
|align=center|1:54
|Tokyo, Japan
|
|-
|Loss
|align=center|5–3–1 (1)
|Takaki Soya
|KO (punch)
|Rizin 16 - Kobe
|
|align=center|1
|align=center|4:02
|Kobe, Japan
|
|-
|Loss
|align=center|5–2–1 (1)
|Haruo Ochi
|Decision (unanimous)
|Deep - 88 Impact
|
|align=center|3
|align=center|5:00
|Tokyo, Japan
|For the DEEP Strawweight championship.
|-
|Draw
|align=center|5–1–1 (1)
|Yutaro Muramoto
|Draw (majority)
|Deep - 85 Impact
|
|align=center|3
|align=center|5:00
|Tokyo, Japan
|
|-
|NC
|align=center|5–1 (1)
|Yuya Kodama
|NC (accidental kick to the groin)
|Deep - 80 Impact
|
|align=center|1
|align=center|4:06
|Tokyo, Japan
|Kodama was unable to continue after a low blow.
|-
|Win
|align=center|5–1
|Yutaro Muramoto
|KO (head kick)
|Deep - Cage Impact 2017 in Korakuen Hall
|
|align=center|2
|align=center|1:42
|Tokyo, Japan
|
|-
|Win
|align=center|4–1
|Noriyuki Takei
|TKO (punches)
|Deep - Osaka Impact 2017
|
|align=center|1
|align=center|4:24
|Osaka, Japan
|
|-
|Loss
|align=center|3–1
|Takuya Goto
|Decision (split)
|Pancrase - Osaka
|
|align=center|3
|align=center|3:00
|Osaka, Japan
|
|-
|Win
|align=center|3–0
|Magisa Magisa
|Submission (armbar)
|Deep - Cage Impact 2016 in Osaka
|
|align=center|2
|align=center|1:25
|Osaka, Japan
|
|-
|Win
|align=center|2–0
|Icho Tomonaga
|TKO
|Deep - Osaka Impact 2016
|
|align=center|1
|align=center|0:16
|Osaka, Japan
|
|-
|Win
|align=center|1–0
|Tatsuki Ozaki
|Decision (unanimous)
|Pancrase - Osaka
|
|align=center|3
|align=center|3:00
|Osaka, Japan
|
|-
|}

Amateur mixed martial arts record

|-
|Win
|align=center|3-0
|Ryoma Uemura
|TKO (punches)
|JML Kansai 12
|
|align=center|1
|align=center|1:14
|Osaka, Japan
|
|-
|Win
|align=center|2-0
|Yuki Doi
|TKO (referee stoppage)
|JML Kansai 11
|
|align=center|1
|align=center|2:46
|Osaka, Japan
|
|-
|Win
|align=center|1-0
|Naoto Arimura
|TKO (referee stoppage)
|JML Kansai 11
|
|align=center|1
|align=center|0:58
|Osaka, Japan
|
|-
|}

See also
 List of Deep champions
 List of current ONE fighters

References

Rizin Fighting Federation
1989 births
Japanese male mixed martial artists
People from Osaka Prefecture
Living people
Sportspeople from Osaka
Flyweight mixed martial artists
Strawweight mixed martial artists